The 2014 China Women's Sevens was the second edition of the China Women's Sevens tournament, and the fourth of five tournaments in the 2013–14 IRB Women's Sevens World Series.

Format 

The teams were drawn into three pools of four teams each. Each team played everyone in their pool one time. The top two teams from each pool advanced to the Cup/Plate brackets while the top 2 third place teams will also compete in the Cup/Plate. The rest of the teams from each group went to the Bowl brackets.

Teams 

A total of twelve teams will compete: The nine "core" teams, and three invited teams.

Core Teams

Invited Teams

Pool Stage

Pool A

Pool B

Pool C

Knockout stage

Bowl

Plate

Cup

2013–14
2013–14 IRB Women's Sevens World Series
rugby union
2014 in women's rugby union
2014 rugby sevens competitions
2014 in Asian rugby union